Gunagado is a district of Somali Region in Ethiopia.

[[History]]

Guna-Gado is a district located in eastern part of Jarar Zone in Somali regional state.

[Gungado] was a district since 2005.

The first person who settled was Ali Ilmi mostly known Ali Agole, 1950.

Guna-Gado is base clan of Reer Haruun.

See also 

 Districts of Ethiopia

References 

Districts of Somali Region